The 2017–18 WCBA season was the 16th season of the Women's Chinese Basketball Association.

The regular season began on Monday, November 13, 2017 and ended on Wednesday, January 17, 2018. The playoffs began on Wednesday, January 24, 2018 and ended on Wednesday, March 14, 2018.

Venues

Foreign Players

Regular Season Standings

Playoffs

The 2018 WCBA Playoffs began on January 24, 2018.

Notes

References

League